The Good Times is the fourth studio album by Mississippi-based rapper Afroman. It was released after his record deal with Universal Records, and is composed of material taken from his previous independent releases. It contains his two hit singles: "Because I Got High" and "Crazy Rap", along with his other popular songs from his two albums. Most of the songs on the album are about growing up in the ghetto of East Palmdale. The album was certified gold in the United States on October 24, 2001 by the RIAA.

Track listing 
 "Because I Got High" (radio edit) – 3:20
 "Crazy Rap" – 5:55
 "She Won't Let Me Fuck" – 6:03
 "Hush" – 4:42
 "Tumbleweed" – 5:23
 "Let's All Get Drunk" – 5:54
 "Tall Cans" – 7:14
 "Palmdale" – 6:42
 "Mississippi" – 5:34
 "The American Dream" – 2:53
 "Because I Got High" (extended version) – 5:10

Notes
 "Mississippi" was remade for The Good Times, and is not the same as the original Because I Got High version.

Charts

Weekly charts

Year-end charts

Certifications

References

2001 compilation albums
Afroman albums
Universal Records compilation albums